Eric Hartzell (born May 28, 1989) is an American former professional ice hockey goaltender. He last played abroad for HK Nitra in the Slovak Extraliga (Slovak).

Playing career
Prior to turning professional, Hartzell attended Quinnipiac University where he played four seasons of NCAA Men's Division I Ice Hockey with the Quinnipiac Bobcats men's ice hockey team. In his final year with the Bobcats, Hartzell was selected to the 2012–2013 NCAA (East) First All-American Team, was named NCAA Top Collegiate Player Hobey Baker Award Hat Trick Finalist, and was selected as the USCHO.com Player of the Year. On April 14, 2013, Hartzell was signed to a two-year entry level contract with the Pittsburgh Penguins.

He made his professional debut in the 2013–14 season with Pittsburgh's American Hockey League affiliate, the Wilkes-Barre/Scranton Penguins.

At the conclusion of his contract with the Penguins, Hartzell was not tendered a new deal and was released to free agency. Unable to garner interest in the NHL or AHL, Hartzell was signed by the Idaho Steelheads of the ECHL on October 11, 2015. Hartzell appeared in 5 games with the Steelheads in the 2015–16 season, before he was loaned on a professional try-out contract to the Stockton Heat of the AHL on November 7, 2015. After featured in relief in a single games with the Heat, Hartzell opted to venture to Germany for the remainder of the season, linking up with Heilbronner Falken of the DEL2.

As a free agent after his tenure with Heilbronner, Hartzell opted to return to the ECHL signing a one-year deal with the Fort Wayne Komets to share goaltending duties alongside Pat Nagle on August 8, 2016. In the 2016–17 season, Hartzell appeared in 19 games with the Komets for 7 wins. Relegated to a backup role, Hartzell opted to conclude his contract with Fort Wayne and return to Europe, signing a deal for the remainder of the year with Slovakian club, HK Nitra of Slovak Extraliga on January 7, 2017.

Career statistics

Awards and honors

References

External links
 

1989 births
Living people
American men's ice hockey goaltenders
Fort Wayne Komets players
Heilbronner Falken players
Idaho Steelheads (ECHL) players
Ice hockey players from Minnesota
Sportspeople from White Bear Lake, Minnesota
HK Nitra players
Quad City Mallards (ECHL) players
Quinnipiac Bobcats men's ice hockey players
Sioux Falls Stampede players
Stockton Heat players
Wheeling Nailers players
Wilkes-Barre/Scranton Penguins players
AHCA Division I men's ice hockey All-Americans
American expatriate ice hockey players in Germany
American expatriate ice hockey players in Slovakia